The British Caribbean Football Association were a football association formed in January 1957. The BCFA was formed having witnessed the success of the West Indies Cricket team in the 1950s and their defeat of England during the decade. The BCFA was not technically a West Indies team as players were also selected from British Guiana who were not members of the West Indies Federation

The six inaugural members were:

 (joined FIFA in 1968)
 (joined FIFA in 1988 as Guyana)
 (joined FIFA in 1978)
 (joined FIFA in 1962)
 (joined FIFA in 1988)
 (joined FIFA in 1964)

None of the associated FA's were members of FIFA at the time of the formation of the BCFA.

Crest

The British Caribbean Football Association supported a design competition and the winning crest was designed by Andy Worrell, a Trinidad oilfield worker.

The Jamaica Gleaner described the crest thus: "It show flags of the West Indies Nation and the Mother Country, along with tropical scenery, typical of Caribbean waters, palm trees, birds and sun. At the top are eleven stars which serve a double purpose—representing the eleven players of the team or the eleven territories in the Association including British Guiana. All this is bounded by a gold chain linking the territories in the Association. The competition was open to residents in the West Indies and British Guiana."

Executive committee

On 20 January 1957, Trinidadian Football Association Chairman Ken Galt was nominated as President of the BCFA. The first Vice-President Jamaican Winston Meekes, then Jamaican Football Association president. The second Vice-President was the Dighton H. Ward of Barbados.

The Trinidad Football Association's Eric James was installed as General Secretary of the BCFA.

England Tour of 1959 

The representative team embarked on a tour of England between August and November 1959. The BCFA team left from Port of Spain aboard the MV Willemstad on 17 August, and arrived in England on 30 August. They played in navy blue shirts with gold trim, and white shorts.

Squad

Ages shown are at the time of the first game on the tour.

Results 

The overall tour record was: P17 W4 D0 L13 F27 A63.

References

Association football governing bodies in the Caribbean
Sports organizations established in 1957